Sarcophaga is a genus of true flies and the type genus of the flesh-fly family (Sarcophagidae). The members of this cosmopolitan genus are frequently known as common flesh flies.

This genus occurs essentially worldwide. These flies are generally well-sized and of a greyish color; like many of their relatives, the typical patterns are lengthwise darker stripes on the thorax and dark and light square dots on the abdomen. Many have conspicuous red compound eyes. These are set further apart in females than in males; the females are also larger on average. As typical for this family, it is almost impossible to tell the species apart from their outward appearance, and many can only be reliably identified by microscopic examination of the males' genitalia.

As the common name implies, their larvae typically feed on decaying meat. Some, however, instead eat the bacteria and other small organisms living on carrion. Many species have adapted to humans, and while they are usually nuisance pests, some are medically significant vectors of pathogens and bacteria. Sometimes, the larvae cause myiasis. Others are parasitoids of pest caterpillars and beneficial in forestry and orchards.

Well-known species are Sarcophaga africa, Sarcophaga bercaea, the grey flesh-fly Sarcophaga bullata, Sarcophaga carnaria, Sarcophaga crassipalpis, the friendly fly Sarcophaga aldrichi and the red-tailed flesh-fly Sarcophaga haemorrhoidalis.

Subgenera
The immense number of Sarcophaga species is divided among the following subgenera, some of which are occasionally considered (and may well be) distinct genera:

Aethianella Zumpt, 1972
Aethiopisca Rohdendorf, 1963
Afrohelicobia Zumpt, 1972
Afrothyrsocnema Rohdendorf, 1963
Alisarcophagaa Fan & Chen, 1981
Amharomyia Verves, 1984
Anthostilophalla Lehrer, 1993
Asceloctella Enderlein, 1928
Asiopierretia Rohdendorf, 1965
Australopierretia Verves, 1987
Baliisca Verves, 1980
Baranovisca Lopes, 1985
Batissophalla Rohdendorf, 1963
Bellieriomima Rohdendorf, 1937
Bercaea (Robineau-Desvoidy, 1863)
Bercaeopsis Townsend, 1917
Beziella Enderlein, 1937
Bilenemyia Verves, 1989
Boettcheria Rohdendorf, 1937
Brasia Strand, 1932
Caledonia Curran, 1929
Callostuckenbergia Lehrer & Lehrer, 1992
Camerounisca Verves, 1989
Cercosarcophaga Zumpt, 1972
Chaetophalla Rohdendorf, 1963
Chrysosarcophaga Townsend, 1933
Curranisca Rohdendorf, 1963
Curtophalla Lehrer, 1994
Cyclophalla Rohdendorf, 1963
Danbeckia Lehrer, 1994
Dinemomyia Chen, 1975
Diplonophalla Lehrer, 1994
Discachaeta Enderlein, 1928
Drakensbergiana Lehrer, 1992
Durbanella Lehrer, 1994
Dysparaphalla Rohdendorf, 1965
Fengia Rohdendorf, 1964
Fergusonimyia Lopes, 1958
Fijimyia Lopes & Kano, 1971
Hadroxena Whitmore, Buenaventura & Pape, 2018
Hardyella Lopes, 1959
Harpagophalla Rohdendorf, 1937
Harpagophalloides Rohdendorf, 1963
Helicophagella Enderlein, 1928
Heteronychia Brauer & Bergenstamm, 1889
Hoa Rohdendorf, 1937
Hosarcophaga Shinonaga & Tumrasvin, 1979
Hyperacanthisca Rohdendorf, 1963
Ihosyia Verves, 1989
Iranihindia Rohdendorf, 1961
Johnsonimima Kano & Lopes, 1971
Johnstonimyia Lopes, 1959
Kalshovenella Baranov, 1941
Kanoa Rohdendorf, 1965
Kanomyia Shinonaga & Tumrasvin, 1979
Kozlovea Rohdendorf, 1937
Kramerea Rohdendorf, 1937
Krameromyia Verves, 1982
Leucomyia Brauer & von Bergenstamm, 1891
Lipoptilocnema Townsend, 1934
Lioplacella Enderlein, 1928
Lioproctia Enderlein, 1928
Liopygia Enderlein, 1928
Liosarcophaga Enderlein, 1928
Macabiella Lehrer, 1994
Mandalania Lehrer, 1994
Mauritiella Verves, 1989
Mehria Enderlein, 1928
Mimarhopocnemis Rohdendorf, 1937
Mindanaoa Lopes & Kano, 1979
Mufindia Verves, 1990
Myorhina Robineau-Desvoidy, 1830
Neobellieria Blanchard, 1939
Neosarcophaga Shewell, 1996
Nesbittia Verves, 1989
Nigerimyia Verves, 1989
Nihonea Rohdendorf, 1965
Notoecus Stein, 1924
Nudicerca Rohdendorf, 1965
Nuzzaciella Lehrer, 1994
Nyikamyia Lehrer, 1994
Pandelleana Rohdendorf, 1937
Pandelleisca Rohdendorf, 1937
Paraethiopisca Zumpt, 1972
Parasarcophaga Johnston & Tiegs, 1921
Petuniophalla Lehrer, 1994
Phalacrodiscus Enderlein, 1928
Phallantha Rohdendorf, 1938
Phallanthisca Rohdendorf, 1965
Phallocheira Rohdendorf, 1937
Phallonychia Verves, 1982
Phallosphaera Rohdendorf, 1938
Phytosarcophaga Rohdendorf, 1937
Poecilometopa Villeneuve, 1913
Poeciphaoides Rohdendorf, 1963
Prionophalla Rohdendorf, 1963
Pseudaethiopisca Verves, 1989
Pseudothyrsocnema Rohdendorf, 1937
Pterolobomyia Lehrer, 1992
Pterophalla Rohdendorf, 1965
Pterosarcophaga Ye, 1981
Robineauella Enderlein, 1928
Rohdendorfisca Ye, 1981
Rosellea Rohdendorf, 1937
Sabiella Verves, 1990
Sarcophaga Meigen, 1826
Sarcorohdendorfia Baranov, 1938
Sarcosolomonia Baranov, 1938
Sarcotachinella Townsend, 1892
Scotathyrsia Enderlein, 1937
Sinonipponia Rohdendorf, 1959
Sisyhelicobia Zumpt, 1972
Stackelbergeola Boris Rohdendorf, 1937
Takanoa Boris Rohdendorf, 1965
Takaraia Kano & Field, 1963
Taylorimyia Lopes, 1959
Thyrsocnema Enderlein, 1928
Tolucamyia Dodge, 1965
Torgopampa Lopes, 1975
Transvaalomyia Lehrer, 1992
Tuberomembrana Fan, 1981
Uroxanthisca Rohdendorf, 1963
Varirosellea Xue, 1979
Wohlfahrtiopsis Townsend, 1917
Xanthopterisca Rohdendorf, 1963
Ziminisca Rohdendorf, 1965
Zombanella Lehrer, 1992
Zumptiopsis Lehrer & Lehrer, 1992
Zumptisca Rohdendorf, 1963

References

Further reading

External links 
 
 

Sarcophagidae
Oestroidea genera
Taxa named by Johann Wilhelm Meigen